is a chain of Japanese yakiniku restaurants

History 
First entered yakiniku restaurant business in 1996 and opened its first franchised restaurant in 1997 after changing to the current name. The first overseas restaurant was opened in the U.S. in 2001 and the second in Taiwan in 2002.

Current development 
There are over six hundred Gyu-Kaku locations in Japan, and locations have also been opened in the United States (including Kansas, New York City, California, New Orleans, Chicago, Houston, Dallas, Hawaii, Philadelphia, Boston, Orlando, Miami, Atlanta, and Cincinnati),  Canada, Hong Kong, Taiwan, Cambodia, Thailand, Indonesia, Malaysia, Singapore, Vietnam and the Philippines. Though Gyu-Kaku is part of Reins International Inc., every restaurant is different in terms of region and selection availability (i.e. outlets in the United States serve locally sourced USDA beef).

Gyu-Kaku also manufactures and purveys its own brand of kimchi in Japanese supermarkets, and a line of dipping sauces and marinades.

See also
 List of barbecue restaurants
Yakiniku

References

External links
  Gyu-Kaku's English Website
  Gyu-Kaku's Vietnamese Website
  Gyu-Kaku 's Japanese Website

Food and drink companies of Japan
Barbecue restaurants
Restaurants in Japan
Japanese brands